Charlie George Pattison (born 28 December 2000) is an English former professional footballer who plays as a midfielder.

Career

Milton Keynes Dons
Pattison joined Milton Keynes Dons' academy at under-9 level, progressing through various age groups and into the club's development squad eventually going on to captain the club's U18 team. On 4 September 2018, whilst still an academy player, Pattison featured for the first team as an 81st-minute substitute against Peterborough United in an EFL Trophy group stage fixture.

Following a spell on loan with non-league Welwyn Garden City, Pattison signed professional terms with Milton Keynes Dons in June 2019. During the 2019–20 season, Pattison enjoyed short spells on loan with non-league sides Kings Langley and Biggleswade Town. However, at the conclusion of the campaign, Pattison was one of nine players released from the club following limited opportunities.

After being released by MK Dons, Pattison had a spell with Banbury United FC and then one with AFC Dunstable.  On 13th January 2023, his signing by AFC Rushden & Diamonds was announced.

Career statistics

Honours
Welwyn Garden City Young Player of the Year: 2018–19
Milton Keynes Dons Academy Player of the Year: 2018–19

References

Living people
2000 births
English footballers
Association football midfielders
Milton Keynes Dons F.C. players
Kings Langley F.C. players
Biggleswade Town F.C. players
English Football League players
Sportspeople from Bedford
Footballers from Bedfordshire